Meanwhile, back at the ranch is a common catchphrase. 

Meanwhile, back at the ranch can also refer to:

 "Meanwhile Back at the Ranch"/"Should I Smoke", a 1974 song by Badfinger
 "Meanwhile Back at the Ranch", a 2000 song by The Clark Family Experience
 Meanwhile, Back at the Ranch (album), a 2005 album by Texas Lightning